The 2016 German Figure Skating Championships was held on December 11–13, 2015 at the Eissporthalle Essen West in Essen. Skaters competed in the disciplines of men's singles, ladies' singles, pair skating, and ice dancing on the senior, junior, and novice levels. The results of the national championships were among the criteria used to choose the German teams to the 2016 World Championships and 2016 European Championships.

Medalists

Senior

Junior

Senior results

Men

Ladies

Pairs

Ice dancing

Junior results

Men

Ladies

Pairs

Ice dancing

External links
 2016 German Championships: Senior results at the Deutsche Eislauf Union
 2016 German Junior Championships: Junior, youth, and novice results at the Deutsche Eislauf Union
 2016 German Championships at the Deutsche Eislauf Union

German Championships
German Figure Skating Championships
Figure Skating Championships